The Cantor distribution is the probability distribution whose cumulative distribution function is the Cantor function.

This distribution has neither a probability density function nor a probability mass function, since although its cumulative distribution function is a continuous function, the distribution is not absolutely continuous with respect to Lebesgue measure, nor does it have any point-masses.  It is thus neither a discrete nor an absolutely continuous probability distribution, nor is it a mixture of these.  Rather it is an example of a singular distribution.

Its cumulative distribution function is continuous everywhere but horizontal almost everywhere, so is sometimes referred to as the Devil's staircase, although that term has a more general meaning.

Characterization 

The support of the Cantor distribution is the Cantor set, itself the intersection of the (countably infinitely many) sets:
 

The Cantor distribution is the unique probability distribution for which for any Ct (t ∈ { 0, 1, 2, 3, ... }), the probability of a particular interval in Ct containing the Cantor-distributed random variable is identically 2−t on each one of the 2t intervals.

Moments 
It is easy to see by symmetry and being bounded that for a random variable X having this distribution, its expected value E(X) = 1/2, and that all odd central moments of X are 0.

The law of total variance can be used to find the variance var(X), as follows.  For the above set C1, let Y = 0 if X ∈ [0,1/3], and 1 if X ∈ [2/3,1].  Then:

 

From this we get:

A closed-form expression for any even central moment can be found by first obtaining the even cumulants

where B2n is the 2nth Bernoulli number, and then expressing the moments as functions of the cumulants.

References

Further reading
  This, as with other standard texts, has the Cantor function and its one sided derivates.
  This is more modern than the other texts in this reference list.
  
  This has more advanced material on fractals.

Continuous distributions
Georg Cantor